David Alexander (born 10 January 1968) is a former professional rugby league player who played for the North Sydney Bears, the Manly-Warringah Sea Eagles, and the Penrith Panthers.

Career
Alexander debuted for North Sydney during the 1989 season. He moved to Manly-Warringah in 1993 and again to Penrith in 1995. He was one of 5 Penrith players whom the ARL agreed to release from their contracts on 29 November 1996 so they could play in the Super League.

References

1968 births
Living people
Australian rugby league players
North Sydney Bears players
Manly Warringah Sea Eagles players
Penrith Panthers players
Rugby league props